Rajesh Premji Varsani (born 29 July 1982) is an Indian-born Kenyan former cricketer.

Varsani was born at Bhuj in the Indian state of Gujarat in July 1982. He emigrated to Kenya and later made two appearances in List A cricket for the Kenya national cricket team against the United Arab Emirates at Nairobi in the 2011–2013 ICC World Cricket League Championship. He scored 57 runs in the first match, helping Kenya to a 66 runs victory. In the second match he kept wicket in place of Jeshani Naran, though was less successful with the bat, being dismissed for a single run by Saqib Ali. Varsani did not feature again for Kenya following the these matches.

References

External links

1982 births
Living people
People from Bhuj
Indian emigrants to Kenya
Kenyan cricketers